Ferragus may refer to:

 Ferragut, a Saracen paladin (in some texts a giant) in the Historia Caroli Magni
 Ferragus, a Saracen giant of Portugal in the medieval romance Valentine and Orson
 Ferragus: Chief of the Devorants, a novel by Honoré de Balzac, also a character in the novel
 Faraj ben Salim, 13th century Sicilian-Jewish physician and translator

See also
Farragus (disambiguation)
Fergus (name)
Farragut (disambiguation)